Behind the Rage: America’s Domestic Violence is the seventh film by documentary film director Deeyah Khan's for ITV Exposure. 
This documentary has testimonies from survivors of domestic violence and victims’ families, and brings insights from social workers and psychologists who work with male perpetrators of domestic violence. The majority of the documentary focuses on those whose voices are rarely heard in conversations about domestic, the perpetrators themselves. 

The documentary received its premiere in the UK on ITV on October 17th 2022. The film has received five star review from The Times.

Cast
Leslie Morgan Steiner
Dr. David Adams (Emerge: Pepetrator education program)
Dorthy Stucky Halley (Family Peace Initiative)
Dr. Sara Brammer (Synergy Services)
Dr. Jackson Katz
Angela Gabriel

References

External links
Official website

2022 television films
2022 films
2022 documentary films
British documentary films
British television documentaries
Films directed by Deeyah Khan